Poststraße is an interchange station on the Cologne Stadtbahn lines 3, 4, 16 and 18 in the Cologne district of Innenstadt. The station lies on Poststraße, after which the station is named.

Currently the station serves 30 trains per hour per direction, the maximum possible with the current technical equipment and at grade-crossing just before the station, regularly, with line 18 running on 5 minute headways and the other 3 lines on 10 minutes each. Once the Nord-Süd Stadtbahn is finished, line 16 will run through the new tunnel, reducing the amount of trains per hour per direction to 24.

The station was opened in 1969 and consists of two side platforms and two rail tracks.

Notable places nearby 
 Church of St. Pantaleon
 Church of St. Georg
 Kleiner & Großer Griechenmarkt
 Hotel im Wasserturm
 Agrippabad

See also 
 List of Cologne KVB stations

References

External links 
 
 station info page 

Cologne KVB stations
Innenstadt, Cologne
Railway stations in Germany opened in 1969
Cologne-Bonn Stadtbahn stations